The 1991 Arkansas State Indians football team represented Arkansas State University as an independent the 1991 NCAA Division I-AA football season. Led by second-year head coach Al Kincaid, the Indians compiled a record of 1–10.

Schedule

References

Arkansas State
Arkansas State Red Wolves football seasons
Arkansas State Indians football